The 2021 Skate Canada International was the second event in the 2021–22 ISU Grand Prix of Figure Skating, a senior-level international invitational competition series. It was held at the Doug Mitchell Thunderbird Sports Centre in Vancouver, British Columbia on October 29–31. Medals were awarded in the disciplines of men's singles, women's singles, pairs, and ice dance. Skaters earned points toward qualifying for the 2021–22 Grand Prix Final.

Entries 
The International Skating Union announced the preliminary assignments on June 29, 2021.

Changes to preliminary assignments

Records 

The following new ISU best scores were set during this competition:

Results

Men

Women

Pairs

Ice dance

References

External links 
 Skate Canada International at the International Skating Union
 
 Results

2021 Skate Canada International
2021 in figure skating
2021 in Canadian sports
October 2021 sports events in Canada